Deportivo Cruz Azul Lagunas is a football club that plays in the Third Division. It is based in the city of Lagunas, Mexico. It's an official reserve team of Cruz Azul.

History 
In the 1960s, the Cooperativa Cemento Cruz Azul continued to establish cities dedicated to its industry, one of which was located on the Isthmus of Tehuantepec and was called Lagunas, Oaxaca, soccer was one of the favorite sports for the development of the cities founded by the company.

Since the 1990s, the team has participated in the Third Division, a category in which it has remained ever since. Between 2003 and 2006 there was a parallel project called Cruz Azul Oaxaca, which played in the Primera División A, which was nourished in part by players from the Lagunas team.

In the 2018–19 season, the team reached the Third Division quarterfinals, one of their best recent appearances. The team has trained some important players for the main team like Javier Aquino and Julio César Domínguez.

The club has also become a summer training venue for C.D. Cruz Azul, where an annual stay is held.

References 

Football clubs in Oaxaca
Cruz Azul